Adio Heimona (Greek: Αντίο Χειμώνα; English: Goodbye winter) is the 19th studio album by Greek singer-songwriter and record producer Nikos Karvelas, released by Legend Recordings in February 2009.

Track listing

External links 
 Official site

2009 albums
Albums produced by Nikos Karvelas
Greek-language albums
Nikos Karvelas albums